International Mother Earth Day was established in 2009, by the United Nations General Assembly under Resolution A/RES/63/278. The Resolution was introduced by The Plurinational State of Bolivia and endorsed by over 50 member states. It recognizes that "the Earth and its ecosystems are our home" and that "it is necessary to promote harmony with nature and the Earth." The term Mother Earth is used because it "reflects the interdependence that exists among human beings, other living species and the planet we all inhabit". It is decided to designate April 22 as International Mother Earth Day.  

General Assembly President Miguel d'Escoto Brockmann welcomed the creation of International Mother Earth Day, saying: "International Mother Earth Day promotes a view of the Earth as the entity that sustains all living things found in nature. Inclusiveness is at the heart of International Mother Earth Day; fostering shared responsibilities to rebuild our troubled relationship with nature is a cause that is uniting people around the world."

See also
 Earth Day
 National Cleanup Day

References

April observances
Mother Earth
United Nations days